Ian McInnes (1901–1977) was an Australian tennis player. He was also a medical doctor. At the 1923 U.S. Championships, McInnes lost in the second round to Manuel Alonso Areizaga. At the 1924 Australasian championships, McInnes caused a huge upset by beating two-time Wimbledon champion Gerald Patterson. Patterson twisted his ankle in the first set and, because of this, his game was affected and he played mainly from the baseline. McInnes lost in the quarter finals to Richard Schlesinger. McInnes lost in the second round of the 1927 Australian championships to Rice Gemmell In 1967 McInnes attended Gerald Patterson's funeral.

Grand Slam finals

Doubles (1 runner-up)

References

1901 births
1977 deaths
Australian male tennis players
Tennis people from Victoria (Australia)